Lindenberg/Eichsfeld is a Verwaltungsgemeinschaft ("collective municipality") in the district Eichsfeld, in Thuringia, Germany. The seat of the Verwaltungsgemeinschaft is in Teistungen.

The Verwaltungsgemeinschaft Lindenberg/Eichsfeld consists of the following municipalities:

 Berlingerode 
 Brehme 
 Ecklingerode 
 Ferna 
 Tastungen 
 Teistungen 
 Wehnde

References

Verwaltungsgemeinschaften in Thuringia